The 2008 NHL Winter Classic (known via corporate sponsorship as the AMP Energy NHL Winter Classic) was an outdoor ice hockey game played in the National Hockey League (NHL) on January 1, 2008, at Ralph Wilson Stadium near Buffalo, New York. It was the league's inaugural Winter Classic game, and was contested between the Pittsburgh Penguins and Buffalo Sabres; the Penguins won, 2–1, in a shootout on a goal by captain Sidney Crosby. The event was the NHL's second outdoor regular season game (following the 2003 Heritage Classic in Edmonton, Alberta, Canada), and the first outdoor regular season professional ice hockey game to be played in the United States. Due to the snowy conditions, the game was at the time colloquially referred to as the "Ice Bowl" by residents of the area and Sabres' fans. The event was sponsored by AMP Energy, and was televised in the United States on NBC and in Canada on CBC and RDS.

The game, which was played at a temporary ice rink built on the football field, set an NHL attendance record of 71,217. The Sabres held a Winter Classic "house party" at HSBC Arena (now KeyBank Center) during the game where another 11,000 fans saw the game shown live on the arena's video scoreboard with synched-up audio from the team's radio coverage. The Buffalo Sabres Alumni Hockey Team played a pre-game at the HSBC Arena as part of the house party festivities. Buffalo Sabres anthem singer Doug Allen sang the Canadian national anthem, as is customary at Sabres home games. Irish tenor Ronan Tynan performed "God Bless America" before the game at the stadium.

The success of the event has led to subsequent outdoor hockey games being scheduled and helped establish the Winter Classic as an annual NHL tradition.

Preparations 
Construction of the outdoor rink began on December 24, the day after the Buffalo Bills played their last home game of the 2007 NFL season. It was built between the 16-yard lines of the football field, under the supervision of NHL facilities operations manager Dan Craig. Initially, six inches (150 mm)  of the nine-inch (230 mm) crown of the football field had to be leveled using styrofoam insulation. On top of the newly created flat surface, three inches (75 mm) of plywood with plastic covering were laid as a base for the necessary piping. At the same time the boards were being put in place, an inch of sand was spread amongst the piping and was then wet by a combination of hoses and timely rain so it could freeze into a rink overnight and be painted four days before the game. Another ¾ of an inch of ice was added to complete the playing surface.

After this experience, Commissioner Gary Bettman stated that the League would like more time to prepare the site for the next outdoor game. He also wanted to ensure that not too many outdoor games are held so the event can remain special.

Attendance 

The game was attended by 71,217 people, setting an NHL attendance record. The former NHL record of 57,167 was set at the Heritage Classic between the Montreal Canadiens and Edmonton Oilers in Edmonton, Alberta, on November 22, 2003. Georges Laraque and Ty Conklin are the only two players who have played in both the Heritage Classic and Winter Classic games. They both played for the Oilers and Penguins, respectively, for each game.

While it was the record for a professional game, it fell short of the then all-time number of 74,554, which was set in "The Cold War" between the University of Michigan and Michigan State University on October 6, 2001. Sabres goaltender Ryan Miller and Penguins forward Adam Hall both played for Michigan State in that game.

Approximately 41,000 tickets to the game were made available to the general public, selling out within 30 minutes of being made available on September 18, 2007. In the face of controversy about the quickness of ticket sales, an official spokesperson for the Sabres called it "a testament to how popular the Sabres are and how many people want to be part of the event."  However, many Penguins fans were left out by not having the opportunity to purchase the tickets after they were made available to the city hosting the event, and they were frustrated by the lack of exclusivity for Penguins season-ticket holders.

Terrence Pegula, who would go on to purchase the Sabres three years later, was among those in attendance. Also in attendance was game show host Pat Sajak, who spoke positively of his experience (although admitting that Ralph Wilson Stadium's size was somewhat of a distraction from the game itself).

Television and radio coverage 
The game was televised in the United States on NBC and in Canada on CBC and RDS. The game garnered a 2.2 rating and drew 3.75 million viewers.

Westwood One carried a nationwide radio broadcast of the game, as did each team's local announcing team for local networks (Rick Jeanneret and Harry Neale for Buffalo, Mike Lange, Paul Steigerwald, and Phil Bourque for Pittsburgh).

NBC had an airplane flying overhead to provide bird's-eye views of the rink, including a live webstream from its camera throughout the game. NBC announcers Mike Emrick and Eddie Olczyk stood in a constructed perch on the penalty box side of the rink, while Darren Pang stood between-the-benches. Jim Hughson and Craig Simpson called the game in the broadcast booth for CBC, with Greg Millen between-the-benches.

Pregame 
Doug Allen sang the Canadian national anthem (O Canada) and Irish tenor Ronan Tynan performed "God Bless America" before the game. The U.S. national anthem ("The Star-Spangled Banner") was not performed. A military flyover was conducted by four UH-60 Blackhawk helicopters.

Rule changes 
The NHL also announced that several rule changes were in effect for this game, to nullify advantages to either team due to the weather conditions. The teams switched ends halfway through the third period. Play was interrupted exactly at the 10:00 minute mark, similar to the end of a period with a horn sounding, a Zamboni resurfacing the ice, and a faceoff following at center ice. The overtime period was similarly divided into two 2:30 segments. In the shootout, each goaltender was permitted to choose which goal to defend, and they each chose the same goal, towards the west side of the stadium.

Game summary 

The teams wore vintage jerseys for the event, with the Penguins wearing powder blue jerseys for the first time since 1973. The Sabres wore their old white jerseys, which they wore from 1978 to 1996.  The game was part of the regular 2007–08 NHL season schedule, replacing a game that would have been held at HSBC Arena, the Sabres' regular home. In addition, the goaltenders also dressed in vintage style, with Ty Conklin and Ryan Miller both wearing retro-painted masks. Ryan Miller also wore a hockey sock on top of his mask, which he changed during each intermission so he could auction all three of them off for charity along with his mask.  Penguins backup Dany Sabourin wore a set of vintage-styled pads but did not play.

Weather for the game was appropriate to the winter setting it was intended to evoke, with game-time temperatures around the freezing mark and snow falling for much of the time, especially during the third period. The weather conditions made play somewhat more difficult for players but were well received by fans.

The Penguins registered 25 shots on goal, and the Sabres had 37, dominating the second and overtime periods, leading those 14–2 and 7–0, respectively. Each goalie allowed one goal in playing time not including the shootout, giving Conklin 36 saves for the Penguins, and Miller 24 for the Sabres.

Number in parenthesis represents the player's total in goals or assists to that point of the season

Team rosters 

 Jocelyn Thibault dressed for the Buffalo Sabres as the back-up goalie and did not enter the game.   Dany Sabourin dressed for the Pittsburgh Penguins as the back-up goalie and did not enter the game.

Scratches
Pittsburgh Penguins: #10 Gary Roberts (injured)
Buffalo Sabres: #4 Nolan Pratt (healthy), #21 Drew Stafford (concussion)

Officials
 Referees — Marc Joannette, Don VanMassenhoven
 Linesmen — Brad Kovachik, Tim Nowak

Future games 
Due to the success of the Winter Classic and its predecessor, outdoor games have been held during subsequent seasons, and the Winter Classic has become an annual NHL tradition. The next Winter Classic was held on January 1, 2009, at Wrigley Field in Chicago, matching the Detroit Red Wings against the Chicago Blackhawks. Winter Classics have been held in every year since, except for 2013, which was interrupted by the 2012–2013 NHL lockout. Five Heritage Classics, one in 2011, one in 2014, one in 2016, one in 2019 and one in 2022 have been held since, with a sixth being planned for 2023. The league expanded its offerings of outdoor games with the introduction of the NHL Stadium Series in 2014. Since the inaugural Winter Classic, the NHL has held 34 additional outdoor games, which included the Winter Classic, the Stadium Series and the Heritage Classic, as well as one-off events like the Centennial Classic, NHL 100 Classic and NHL Outdoors at Lake Tahoe games.

See also 
2007–08 Buffalo Sabres season
2007–08 Pittsburgh Penguins season
List of outdoor ice hockey games
List of ice hockey games with highest attendance

References

External links 

NHL.com game summary
Game boxscore

 Hockey News time-lapse photography of rink construction

NHL Winter Classic
Winter Classic
NHL Winter Classic
Buffalo Sabres games
Pittsburgh Penguins games
Sports competitions in New York (state)